Mohd Firdaus bin Azizul (born 3 January 1988 in Seremban, Negeri Sembilan) is a Malaysian footballer currently playing for KSR SAINS as forwards in Malaysia M3 League.

Career statistics

Club

Honours
Malaysia Cup: 2009, 2011
Malaysia FA Cup: 2010

References

External links
 
 Firdaus Azizul Statistics

1988 births
Living people
Malaysian footballers
People from Negeri Sembilan
Negeri Sembilan FA players
Felcra FC players
Malaysia Premier League players
Association football forwards
Malaysian people of Malay descent